Country pop (also known as pop country or urban cowboy) is a fusion genre of country music and pop music that was developed by members of the country genre out of a desire to reach a larger, mainstream audience. Country pop music blends genres like rock, pop, and country, continuing similar efforts that began in the late 1950s, known originally as the Nashville sound and later on as Countrypolitan. By the mid-1970s, many country artists were transitioning to the pop-country sound, which led to some records' charting high on mainstream top 40 as well as the Billboard country chart. In-turn, many pop and easy listening artists crossed over to country charts during this time. After declining in popularity during the neotraditional movement of the 1980s, country pop had a comeback in the 1990s with a sound that drew more heavily on pop rock and adult contemporary.

History

Beginnings: Nashville sound/50s-60s

The joining of country and pop began in the 1950s when studio executives Chet Atkins and Owen Bradley wanted to create a new kind of music for the young adult crowd after "rockabilly stole away much of country music's youth audience". According to Bill Ivey, this innovative genre originated in Nashville, Tennessee and thus became known as the Nashville Sound. He believes that the "Nashville Sound often produced records that sounded more pop than country, after the removal of the fiddle and banjo. Patsy Cline, Jim Reeves, and Eddy Arnold were among the most popular artists during this time.  The famous male artists to come out of this genre were Marty Robbins, Jim Reeves and Eddy Arnold. Both Reeves and Arnold had major influence on their RCA labelmate Elvis Presley, apparent not only in secular songs, but even more so in country gospel songs. Patsy Cline was a famous female country singer in the early 1960s. Skeeter Davis "The End of the World", Sonny James "Young Love", Jenny C.Riley "Harper Valley P.T.A.", and Bobby Goldsboro "Honey" were 60s pop country hits. Even though Cline also gained widespread acceptance from country and pop audiences alike, the Nashville Sound was not well received by country purists, and faced competition, first from the Bakersfield Sound and later the outlaw movement on that front; on the pop side, the format was overshadowed by the British Invasion, which was taking place during the same time that Cline and Reeves died by airplane accident.

1970s country pop

The Nashville sound eventually evolved into countrypolitan during the 1970s and had varying levels of success, with several artists recording in the style: Ray Price ("For the Good Times" 1970), Charley Pride ("Kiss an Angel Good Morning" 1971), Mac Davis ("Baby, Don't Get Hooked on Me" 1972), Charlie Rich ("The Most Beautiful Girl" 1974), Billy Swan ("I Can Help" 1974), Ray Stevens ("The Streak" 1974), Jessi Colter ("I'm Not Lisa" 1975), Crystal Gayle ("Don't It Make My Brown Eyes Blue" 1977), Kris Kristofferson ("Why Me" 1973), and Lynn Anderson ("Rose Garden (Joe South song)" 1970) were all charted pop-influenced country hits during the 1970s.

Country pop started when pop music singers like Glen Campbell, John Denver, Olivia Newton-John, and Anne Murray (Canada), began having hits on the country charts. Songs like Campbell's "Rhinestone Cowboy" was a crossover hit between the pop and country charts. Rhinestone Cowboy was produced by blue-eyed soul writer team Dennis Lambert & Brian Potter and written by Larry Weiss. Denver's single "Take Me Home, Country Roads"  went to No. 2 on the Billboard charts.  Denver's career flourished from then on, and he had a series of hits over the next four years. In 1972, Denver scored his first Top Ten album with Rocky Mountain High, with its title track reaching the Top Ten in 1973. In 1974 and 1975, Denver had a string of four No. 1 songs ("Sunshine on My Shoulders," "Annie's Song," "Thank God I'm a Country Boy," "I'm Sorry") and two No. 1 albums (John Denver's Greatest Hits, Back Home Again). Another crossover artist was Olivia Newton-John, who emerged from Australia in the mid-1970s, hoping to make it big in the United States. Her single "Let Me Be There" became a big pop-country crossover hit in 1974. She won a Grammy award for "Best Female Country Vocal Performance" for the song, and also won the Country Music Association's most coveted award for females, "Female Vocalist of the Year" (beating out established Nashville artists Dolly Parton, Loretta Lynn, and Tanya Tucker, as well as Canadian transplant Anne Murray). Newton-John began moving away from country in the late 1970s after starring in Grease and focused mostly on pop music from then onward.

The debate raged into 1975 and reached its apex at that year's Country Music Association Awards when reigning Entertainer of the Year Charlie Rich (who himself had a series of crossover hits) presented the award to his successor, John Denver. As he read Denver's name, Rich set fire to the envelope with a cigarette lighter. The ACE would only last two years; its two biggest backers, firm traditionalists George Jones and Tammy Wynette, faced a bitter divorce, and Jean Shepard, the other major backer of the ACE, closed down the organization when she could not find others that shared her enthusiasm for the association's purpose. Bellamy Brothers "Let Your Love Flow," Starland Vocal Band "Afternoon Delight"      (1976), Amazing Rhythm Aces "Third Rate Romance" (1976) were examples of late 70s pop country hits.

In 1977, Kenny Rogers, former frontman of the rock band The First Edition, burst onto the country charts with "Lucille" and would go on to become the most successful of the country pop performers, topping charts.  After "Lucille," Rogers had a string of songs that did well on both the country and pop charts around the world, including "Daytime Friends," "The Gambler," and "Coward of the County," all of which were produced by Larry Butler. Rogers would go on to push the boundaries of pop influence in country music, having records produced by the likes of The Bee Gees, Lionel Richie, David Foster, and George Martin, all of which did well in both the pop and country markets. Barbara Mandrell's vocal style is also known for blue-eyed soul style. Several of her other hits charted on the country adult contemporary charts, but her songs were the Bubbling under Billboard top 100 charts. She was one of country music's most successful artists during the 1970s and 1980s. She was involved in a serious car accident in 1984. Her big country hits included "Sleeping Single In a Double Bed," and "(If Loving You is Wrong) I Don't Wanna be Right.

In 1977, Dolly Parton was crossing over into the pop music world with No. 1 country and No. 3 pop hit that year, "Here You Come Again.

1980s

Parton earned another big hit with "9 to 5", which topped both the country and pop singles charts in early 1981, supplemented by the 1980 film of the same name.

Country pop reached an early peak immediately following the movie Urban Cowboy in the early 1980s. Urban Cowboy was the third music-themed hit film to star John Travolta, each from a different genre; much like Saturday Night Fever did for disco and 'Grease did for oldies, Urban Cowboy likewise popularized pop-country, helping to boost the career of Mickey Gilley in particular (whose real-life bar and music were featured in the film), along with other songs that appeared on the film's soundtrack.

Willie Nelson, and Dottie West came back in 80s. Dottie West released singles series of hit duets with Kenny Rogers. Kenny Rogers also had a duet hit with Parton, the Bee Gees-penned "Islands in the Stream", which topped the country and pop singles charts in late 1983. The Bee Gees themselves have one credited country hit to their name, 1978's "Rest Your Love on Me," which was made an even bigger hit by Conway Twitty in 1980.) Because of this, Dottie West achieved her biggest success as a country singer during this time, acquiring her first No. 1 hit as a solo artist thanks to her music in 1980 titled "A Lesson in Leaving".

Oak Ridge Boys, Alabama, Eddie Rabbitt, Juice Newton, Bertie Higgins, and Ronnie Milsap also had crossover success during the early 1980s. The Oak Ridge Boys gained crossover hit "Elvira" in 1981. Four of Alabama's most successful songs of the early 1980s—"Feels So Right", "Love in the First Degree", Take Me Down", and "The Closer You Get" (the last two of which were covers of songs by then-pop band Exile)—all reached the Top 40 of the Billboard Hot 100, while four of Ronnie Milsap's No. 1 songs between 1980 and 1982 reached the Hot 100s Top 20, the most successful of which was the No. 5 hit "(There's) No Gettin' Over Me". Rabbitt had three top-5 pop songs in 1980–1981, and "I Love a Rainy Night" reached No. 1 on both the Hot 100 and Billboard Hot Country Singles chart. Country star Juice Newton also achieved country-pop success with several crossover hits in the early '80s, including "Queen of Hearts", "The Sweetest Thing (I've Ever Known)", and Grammy-winner "Break It To Me Gently," also penning "Sweet Sweet Smile," the only country hit for easy-listening act The Carpenters. Former pop acts, such as Exile, Merrill Osmond (both solo and with his fellow Osmond Brothers; sister Marie Osmond also had a career renaissance in this period), Bill Medley (formerly of The Righteous Brothers), Tom Jones, Michael Johnson, Billy Joe Royal, B. J. Thomas, Nicolette Larson, Paul Davis and Dan Seals ("England Dan" of England Dan and John Ford Coley) began targeting their music at the country market in the early 1980s with a country-pop sound. In 1976 Engelbert Humperdinck gained crossover hit between pop and country top-40 hit "After the Lovin'".

Although a number of country pop artists continued to have hits, most notably Alabama, Parton, Mandrell, Rabbitt, and Milsap, the mid-1980s saw a major sea change within the country music industry and the revival of traditional country sounds, as the boost in country's crossover popularity had collapsed; by 1984, country record sales had fallen to the point they were before Urban Cowboy was released.

1990s revival

Country pop enjoyed a resurgence in the 1990s, primarily because of the beginning proliferation of country music to the FM radio dial, which in turn was aided by the increase of FCC licenses for suburban and rural FM stations in the late 1980s and an increase in talk radio on the AM dial, as well as a decision by Billboard to no longer count record sales toward the country singles chart, giving country radio full power to determine a chart ranking by their collective airplay. The commercial boom in the industry during this time was also attributable to the rise of talented artists who coincided with the implementation of new marketing strategies that were meant to attract a larger fan base; this further pushed the genre into a pop musical style with an emerging new image. Garth Brooks rose to fame during the 1990s with a string of several extremely successful albums and songs. Shania Twain would rival this success with her three albums The Woman in Me, Come On Over, and Up!. In the last few years, country singer LeAnn Rimes has proved her ability to sing country pop songs such as the record-setting "How Do I Live", which spent 69 weeks on the Billboard Hot 100, the second longest single in the record history. This achievement came in spite of the fact that a nearly identical version of the same song by Trisha Yearwood was released at the same time and was also a hit. Rimes also had a hit with the pop songs "Can't Fight the Moonlight" and "I Need You", the latter of which required a remix to be suitable for country radio.

Incorporating elements of pop into country music became extremely popular by the late '90s, thus producing many crossover hits and artists, especially on the adult contemporary charts. Country love songs also became more popular with songs like "To Make You Feel My Love", "Cowboy Take Me Away", "I Love You", "Breathe", "It's Your Love", "Just to See You Smile", "This Kiss", "The Way You Love Me", "You're Still the One", "From This Moment On", "You've Got a Way", "Valentine", etc.

In the 1990s, many country artists experienced huge crossover success. In addition to Brooks, Twain, McBride and Rimes, Billy Ray Cyrus, Tim McGraw, Faith Hill, Dixie Chicks, Jo Dee Messina, Martina McBride, Lonestar, Mary-Chapin Carpenter and Wynonna Judd all had songs cross over to Top 40 and/or Adult Contemporary radio, sometimes with remixes eliminating steel guitars and other "country" elements to be more suitable for pop radio.  Brooks, Reba McEntire, and other artists also maintained high profiles on the album charts despite having less radio crossover success.

2000s and 2010s

The early 2000s also saw continued success of these artists. Lee Ann Womack scored a big hit with "I Hope You Dance", peaking at number one on the U.S. Adult Contemporary chart. The Dixie Chicks had continued success with a less mainstream country-pop sound when they released their bluegrass-influenced album Home in 2002. However, by the mid-2000s there were fewer country acts having crossover success. That was until singer Carrie Underwood won the fourth season of American Idol in May 2005. 

With her exposure from American Idol, Underwood's debut single, "Inside Your Heaven", became the first song by a prominently country artist to ever debut at number one on the Billboard Hot 100. Underwood continued to have crossover success in 2006 and 2007, with her hit single "Before He Cheats", which was notable for becoming a success on mainstream pop radio without a more "pop-friendly" remix. Underwood has had additional, but more spotty, success on pop radio since. Nonetheless, she disproved the notion that country artists, especially country female artists, were limited to success only within one genre. Further supplying that evidence was the success of Taylor Swift, who released her debut album in 2006.

Swift rose to fame in the late 2000s as a teenage artist, buoyed by the success of her country pop singles "Teardrops On My Guitar" and "Our Song", with the latter making Swift the youngest person in history to single-handedly write and perform a number-one song on the Billboard Hot Country Songs chart. Her chart-topping second studio album Fearless was released in 2008; it spawned international hit singles "Love Story" and "You Belong With Me", becoming two of the best selling singles of all time. In 2009, Swift became the first country artist in history to win an MTV Video Music Award. Later in 2010, Swift won the Grammy Award for Album of the Year and Best Country Album for Fearless, becoming the youngest artist to win the top prize at that time. Fearless went on to become Diamond certified by Recording Industry Association of America for moving over 10 million units in the U.S. Her subsequent albums Speak Now (2010) and Red (2012) topped multiple charts globally, including the Top Country Albums and Billboard 200; both of those albums sold 1 million copies in their debut week sales, opening 1.0 million for Speak Now and 1.2 million for Red. On Red, Swift incorporated elements of electronic and dance such as dubstep and worked with pop producers Max Martin and Shellback on several tracks, including the pop hits "We Are Never Ever Getting Back Together", "I Knew You Were Trouble", and "22", which were more favored by pop radio over country radio. Swift collaborated with rapper B.o.B on his country rap single "Both of Us", and dueted with Tim McGraw on his 2013 single "Highway Don't Care" featuring Keith Urban. Swift labeled herself as a pop artist since 2014's 1989, which also won the Grammy awards for Album of the Year and Best Pop Vocal album, making Swift the first and only artist to win those awards in both pop and country genres. The subsequent Reputation (2017) and Lover (2019) were pop albums, though Lover drew on country influences in songs like "Lover" and "Soon You'll Get Better"; the latter being a collaboration with Dixie Chicks. Swift has also written songs for other country pop acts, such as Little Big Town's "Better Man" and Sugarland's "Babe". Achieving both national and international prominence through her tour gross, sales records and critical acclaim, Swift has been credited for bringing recognition of country music "within the broad expanse of music worldwide"; the Country Music Association acknowledged that her talent and presence "will have a long-term positive impact on the appreciation of country music for generations to come".

Other examples of prominent country-pop artists from this decade included Lady A, Sugarland, Keith Urban, and Kenny Chesney.

2010s–present

The 2010s saw many changes  for the country-pop genre, not only in sound, but also in values; there was a significant shift away from big-voiced power ballads to more irreverent, casual, hip-hop influenced styles. One such trend was the controversial bro-country subgenre, which Vulture described as "music by and of the tatted, gym-toned, party-hearty young American white dude."

During this decade, Uncle Kracker achieved success when his number 3 adult contemporary hit "Smile" also became a number 6 country hit. Jason Aldean and Kelly Clarkson hit number 3 on adult contemporary, 9 on adult pop and 1 on country charts with the song "Don't You Wanna Stay". Other records to hit on both the pop and country charts included Miley Cyrus' "The Climb", Lady A's "Just A Kiss", The Band Perry's "If I Die Young", Kelly Clarkson's "Mr. Know It All", Hunter Hayes' "Wanted", and Florida Georgia Line's "Cruise". Sam Hunt has also earned significant crossover appeal. His 2014 debut album Montevallo reached No. 1 on Top Country Albums and number 3 on the Billboard 200. His 2017 single "Body Like a Back Road" reached No. 1 on Hot Country Songs, number 6 on the Billboard Hot 100, and number 11 on Adult Top 40.

In 2018, many country artists achieved international pop hit singles in collaborations with mainstream pop artists. This included Chris Stapleton who collaborated with Justin Timberlake on Hot 100 top ten single "Say Something"; Urban-pop star Bebe Rexha whose duet with the country duo Florida Georgia Line "Meant to Be" reached No. 2 both in Australia and in the U.S.; and German DJ Zedd whose dance hit "The Middle" featured main vocals from Maren Morris and peaked at No. 5 on the Billboard Hot 100.

Of particular note, in 2012, Billboard restored recording sales to the chart formula but also added airplay from non-country stations, giving an inherent advantage to country pop crossover songs, at the same time maintaining the 1990 formula solely to measure country radio airplay. After the change, crossover songs have increasingly set the record for the longest run atop the country chart for longer and longer stretches; "Meant to Be" currently holds the record, 50 weeks and counting as of November 2018, more than double the pre-2012 record (Leroy Van Dyke's "Walk On By" was atop the chart for 19 weeks in 1963, during the 1958-1990 period of a unified sales, jukebox and airplay chart; three songs topped the various separate country charts for 21 weeks each between 1948 and 1955).

The way audiences consumed their music also changed during the 2010s decade, as streaming services became more prominent, thus affecting how artists marketed their songs. Being played on the radio was no longer a requirement to be a contender in the country industry, as it had been for decades before; one such example was Kacey Musgraves. Despite receiving little airplay for her singles sent to country radio, Musgraves won the Grammy award for Album of the Year in 2019, for her fourth studio album Golden Hour. Musgraves's success was unprecedented in the sense that she earned fans from both the pop and country genres without the benefit of airplay on country radio, instead promoting her music through online media platforms such as YouTube and Apple Music. The Hoya pointed out Musgraves's groundbreaking approach, writing, "Musgraves's refusal to bend the knee for Nashville record label executives, coupled with her massive success, proves she is the Nashville big machine's worst nightmare. She is a female artist who managed to find widespread success in an industry that endlessly tried to muzzle her."

The disparity between male and female artists on country radio became even more obvious during the back half of this decade, with one study finding that male artists accounted for 5.5 to 1 in total airplay during the years 2000–2018. In 2018, that number only increased, with a ratio of male vs. female at 9.7 to 1. In 2015, radio consultant Keith Hill made controversial comments about why women received less representation on the radio, referring to male artists as the "salad" and women as "tomatoes"; the controversy became known as Tomato-gate.

Collaborations between country and pop artists became even more popularized during this decade, as well. In October 2019, country duo Dan + Shay released a joint single with pop singer-songwriter Justin Bieber, "10,000 Hours", which went to number one on both the Billboard Hot Country Songs and Country Airplay charts. In April 2020, country singer-songwriter Kelsea Ballerini released "The Other Girl" as a joint single with pop singer Halsey from her third studio album kelsea. The single peaked within the top twenty of both the Hot Country Songs and U.S. Adult Top 40 charts. At the February 2020 Country Radio Seminar, there was discussion on the increase in fan attention to pop and country collaborations, in addition to an increase in the use of streaming services.

In 2020, American Idol finalist Gabby Barrett topped Billboard's Hot Country Songs for over 20 weeks with her single, "I Hope", which was later remixed into a duet with pop singer-songwriter Charlie Puth. Their collaboration went on to top Billboard's Adult Pop Songs chart in October 2020. In its 45th week, the single reached the top five of the all-genre Billboard Hot 100, achieving the slowest climb to the top five in the chart's history.

Two artists that were influential in shifting mainstream attitudes about the genre's more pop-inflected sound were Sam Hunt and Maren Morris. As NPR Music wrote, "Sam Hunt and Maren Morris arrived on the scene in the years that followed, each of them possessing fluency in the postures and cadences of millennial pop that turned heads and blurred boundaries. "Modern country singers love to flaunt phrases and attitudes borrowed from hip-hop, but Hunt's borrowings are softer and sneakier," noted Kelefa Sanneh. Jon Caramanica said: "Think of all the ways dissenters have tried to upend country in recent years: by sneaking in rhythmic vocal tics learned from rappers, by thinning out the genre's musical baggage, by pledging inclusive values. Ms. Morris, an astute synthesizer, has studied and perfected them all." In an article published in 2019, Time called Morris "the future of country music." In November 2020, Morris won three Country Music Association awards, including two for her 2019 single "The Bones"; it also received a Grammy nomination for Best Country Song. The year previously, she won Album of the Year for her sophomore effort Girl, signifying a critical, mainstream shift in attitude about what constituted the country sound. "The Bones" also received Song of the Year at the 56th ACM awards.

In January 2021, Nashville Scene pointed out the commercial impact and critical acclaim brought on by songs considered to be crossover hits, writing, "The walls around the country genre seem evermore flimsy these days. Thanks in part to streaming, “Old Town Road” became the most-certified song in RIAA history earlier this month, racking up 14 million sales. Morris's “The Bones,” winner of two CMA Awards and nominated for a Grammy, topped four different Billboard charts and peaked at No. 12 on the weekly Hot 100. “The Middle,” her 2018 dance-pop collaboration with producers Zedd and Grey, peaked at No. 5 on the weekly Hot 100 Songs and was nominated for three Grammys." Still, the debate on what constituted the country sound continued into the 2020s decade. Despite placing at the top of Billboard's Top Country Albums chart, Kacey Musgraves's album  Star-Crossed was deemed ineligible for nomination in the Grammy's Best Country Album category for the 64th Grammys, owing to the policy that potential nominated albums must contain at least "51 percent of new country recordings". Billboard, however, pointed out that Musgraves was hardly the first to face controversy from the Grammys; previous records nominated in Pop categories included Dolly Parton's "Here You Come Again" and "Rhinestone Cowboy" by Glen Campbell. Musgraves did, however, earn two nominations for Best Country Song and Best Country Performance for the album track, "Camera Roll."

See also
 Blues
 "Gone Country"
 "Long Time Gone"
 "Murder on Music Row"
 Self-parody

References

 
Country music genres
Pop music genres